Cheryl Rivers (born September 12, 1951) is an American politician who served in the Vermont Senate from the Windsor district from 1991 to 2003.

References

1951 births
Living people
Democratic Party Vermont state senators